Thailand is variably divided into different sets of regions, the most notable of which are the six-region grouping used in geographic studies, and the four-region grouping consistent with the Monthon administrative regional grouping system formerly used by the Ministry of Interior. These regions are the largest subdivisions of the country.

In contrast to the administrative divisions of the provinces of Thailand, the regions no longer have an administrative character, but are used for statistical or academic purposes.

Grouping systems 
A six-region system is commonly used for geographical and scientific purposes. This system dates to 1935. It was formalised in 1977 by the National Geographical Committee, which was appointed by the National Research Council. It divides the country into the following regions:

 Northern Thailand
 Northeastern Thailand
 Western Thailand
 Central Thailand
 Eastern Thailand
 Southern Thailand

The four-region system, used in some administrative and statistical contexts, and also as a loose cultural grouping, includes the western and eastern regions within the central region, while grouping the provinces of Sukhothai, Phitsanulok, Phichit, Kamphaeng Phet, Phetchabun, Nakhon Sawan, and Uthai Thani in the northern region. This is also the regional system most commonly used on national television, when discussing regional events. It divides the country into the following regions:

 Northern Thailand (Lanna)
 Northeastern Thailand (Isan)
 Central Thailand (Siam)
 Southern Thailand (Tambralinga)

The Thai Meteorological Department divides the country into six regions for meteorological purposes. It differs from the four-region system in that the east is regarded as a separate region, the south is divided into east and west coasts, and Nakhon Sawan and Uthai Thani are grouped in the central region.

Comparison

Regional economic disparities 
Thailand's economic activities are concentrated in Bangkok and the central region. In 2013, the central region's gross regional product (GRP) contributed 40.9 percent to Thailand's GDP. Other regions accounted for 10.9 percent (northeastern); 8.8 percent (northern); and 8.6 percent (southern). GRP per capita varied. The average GRP per capita of the central region was 280,734 baht, while that of the northeastern region was 74,532 baht.

Human Development Regions  
This is a list of the 4 Thai regions and the capital city of Bangkok by Human Development Index as of 2023 with data for the year 2021.

See also 

 List of countries by Human Development Index
 List of regions of Vietnam
 Organization of the government of Thailand
 Regions of Indonesia

References

External links 
 Population by Planning Regions and Provinces

 
Subdivisions of Thailand